Qaleh Now (also Romanized as Qal`eh Now) is a village in Bid Zard Rural District, in the Central District of Shiraz County, Fars Province, Iran. At the 2006 census, its population was 170, in 37 families.

References 

Populated places in Shiraz County